"The Lottery" is a short story by Shirley Jackson that was first published in The New Yorker on June 26, 1948. The story describes a fictional small American community which observes an annual tradition known as "the lottery", in which a member of the community is selected by chance and stoned to death to ensure a good harvest and purge the town of bad omens. The lottery, its preparations, and its execution are all described in detail, though what actually happens to the selected person is not revealed until the end.

Jackson and The New Yorker were both surprised by the initial negative response from readers; subscriptions were canceled and much hate mail was sent throughout the summer of its first publication, with Jackson receiving at least 10 letters per day. The Union of South Africa banned the story because some parts of Africa still used stoning as a punishment.

The story has been dramatized several times, including as a radio drama, film, and graphic novel. It has been subjected to considerable sociological and literary analysis, and has been described as one of the most famous short stories in the history of American literature.

Plot 
Details of contemporary small-town American life are embroidered upon a description of an annual ritual known as "the lottery". In a small, unnamed village of about 300 residents, the locals are in an excited yet nervous mood on June 27. Children pile up stones as the adults assemble for their annual event, which is apparently practiced to ensure a good harvest; Old Man Warner quotes an old proverb, "Lottery in June, corn be heavy soon." However, some nearby villages have already discontinued the lottery, and rumors are spreading that a village farther north is considering doing the same.

The lottery preparations start the night before, with coal merchant Mr. Summers and postmaster Mr. Graves drawing up a list of all the extended families in town and preparing one paper slip per family. All slips are blank except one, which is later revealed to be marked with a black dot. The slips are folded and placed in a black wooden box, which is stored in a safe at Mr. Summers' office until the lottery is scheduled to begin. 

Upon the morning of the lottery, the townspeople gather shortly before 10 a.m. in order to have everything done in time for lunch. First, the heads of the extended families each draw one slip from the box, but they do not unfold them until all the slips have been drawn. Bill Hutchinson gets the marked slip, meaning that his family has been chosen. His wife, Tessie, protests that Mr. Summers rushed him through the drawing, but the other townspeople dismiss her complaint. As the Hutchinson family consists of only one household, a second drawing to choose one household within the family is skipped.

For the final drawing, one slip is placed in the box for each member of the household: Bill, Tessie, and each of their three children. Each of the five draws a slip, and Tessie gets the marked one. The townspeople pick up the gathered stones and begin throwing them at her as she screams about the injustice of the lottery.

Themes

Scapegoating and mob mentality
One of the major ideas of "The Lottery" is that of a scapegoat. The act of stoning someone to death yearly purges the town of the bad and allows for the good. This is hinted in the references to agriculture.

The story also speaks of mob psychology and the idea that people can abandon reason and act cruelly if they are part of a large group of people behaving in the same manner. The idyllic setting of the story also demonstrates that violence and evil can take place anywhere and in any context. This also shows how people can turn on each other so easily. When or where it is set, specifically, is never said, leaving some to consider it science fiction.

Blind tradition

Alongside the mob mentality, the author illustrates a society that follows tradition without reason, establishing a theme that people should not blindly follow a tradition that has lost its original meaning. Irony, symbols, and language all contribute to such an interpretation. This message dominates the story, from the initial pleasant description of the town to the surprise ending of the stoning. In the very first paragraph, she describes the setting as "clear and sunny, with the fresh warmth of a full summer day" (Jackson 31). By invoking a warm and comfortable setting, the author establishes a positive overtone for the beginning of the story. Soon after, she supports this tone by describing how the children innocently play, describing how "Bobby Martin ducked under his mother's grasping hand and ran, laughing, back to the pile of stones" (31). Bobby, due to his naïveté, is innocently laughing about the stones that will soon be used as murder weapons.  

Jackson turns to the townspeople, who are wholly committed to the lottery. She makes this painfully clear when Tessie protests “You didn’t give him time enough to take any paper he wanted. I saw you. It wasn’t fair!” (45). Tessie protests not the lottery itself, but only the interference during the drawing. She repeats, in the final line of the text, "It isn't fair, it isn't right" (79). Even after being chosen for stoning, Tessie remains loyal to the practice of the lottery, blind to its cruelty even to her death. 

Jackson further illustrates the blindness of the townspeople, showing they have forgotten the tradition's meaning. Describing the black box from which slips are drawn, Jackson writes "the present box had been made with some pieces of the box that had preceded it" (31). While the physical characteristics of the lottery like the box and slips have been modernized over time, only the moral implication of the murder is unchanged throughout the history of the tradition. The story even states that "because so much of the ritual had been forgotten or discarded, Mr. Summers had been successful in having slips of paper substituted for the chips of wood that had been used for generations" (31). Specifically, Mr. Summers realizes that much of the town's tradition has been weakened since its inception, and he actively modernizes it. However, this society does not notice this due to its status of "tradition," regardless of its true meaning. Throughout "The Lottery," Jackson aims to establish, through the use of irony, symbols, and language choice, a theme that emphasizes the danger of following meaningless tradition. The story speaks about those who blindly follow traditions without regard for the consequences.

Reception

Readers
The New Yorker received a "torrent of letters" inquiring about the story, "the most mail the magazine had ever received in response to a work of fiction". Many readers demanded an explanation of the situation in the story, and a month after the initial publication, Jackson responded in the San Francisco Chronicle (July 22, 1948):

Jackson lived in North Bennington, Vermont, and her comment reveals that she had Bennington in mind when she wrote "The Lottery". In a 1960 lecture (printed in her 1968 collection Come Along with Me) she recalled the hate mail she received in 1948:

The New Yorker kept no records of the phone calls, but letters addressed to Jackson were forwarded to her. That summer she regularly took home 10 to 12 forwarded letters each day. She also received weekly packages from The New Yorker containing letters and questions addressed to the magazine or editor Harold Ross, plus carbon copies of the magazine's responses mailed to letter writers.

Critical interpretations
Helen E. Nebeker's essay The Lottery': Symbolic Tour de Force" in American Literature (March 1974) claims that every major name in the story has a special significance.

Fritz Oehlschlaeger, in "The Stoning of Mistress Hutchinson: Meaning and Context in 'The Lottery (Essays in Literature, 1988), wrote:

The 1992 episode "Dog of Death" of The Simpsons features a scene referring to "The Lottery". During the peak of the lottery fever in Springfield, news anchor Kent Brockman announces on television that people hoping to get tips on how to win the jackpot have borrowed every available copy of Shirley Jackson's book The Lottery at the local library. One of them is Homer, who throws the book into the fireplace after Brockman reveals that "Of course, the book does not contain any hints on how to win the lottery. It is, rather, a chilling tale of conformity gone mad." In her book Shirley Jackson: Essays on the Literary Legacy, Bernice Murphy comments that this scene displays some of the most contradictory things about Jackson: "It says a lot about the visibility of Jackson's most notorious tale that more than 50 years after its initial creation it is still famous enough to warrant a mention in the world's most famous sitcom. The fact that Springfield's citizenry also miss the point of Jackson's story completely ... can perhaps be seen as an indication of a more general misrepresentation of Jackson and her work."

In "Arbitrary Condemnation and Sanctioned Violence in Shirley Jackson's 'The Lottery (December 2004), Patrick J. Shields suggests there is a connection between the death penalty and "The Lottery" when writing:

Others have made comparisons between the lottery and the military draft, whereby young men aged 18–25 were selected at random for military service by the Selective Service System. The story was written just three years after the end of World War II, in which ten million men were drafted and over 400,000 died, and was published just two days after the enactment of the Military Selective Service Act, which re-established the draft.

Adaptations

In addition to numerous reprints in magazines, anthologies, and textbooks as well as comic adaptation,  "The Lottery" has been adapted for radio, live television, a 1953 ballet, films in 1969 and 1997, a TV movie, an opera, and a one-act play by Thomas Martin.

1951 radio version
A radio adaptation by NBC was broadcast March 14, 1951, as an episode of the anthology series NBC Presents: Short Story. Writer Ernest Kinoy expanded the plot to include scenes at various characters' homes before the lottery and a conversation between Bill and Tessie Hutchinson (Bill suggests leaving town before the lottery happens, but Tessie refuses because she wants to go shopping at Floyd Summers's store after the lottery is over). Kinoy deleted certain characters, including two of the Hutchinsons' three children, and added at least one character, John Gunderson, a schoolteacher who publicly objects to the lottery being held, and at first refuses to draw. Finally, Kinoy included an ending scene describing the townspeople's post-lottery activities and an afterword, in which the narrator suggested: "Next year, maybe there won't be a Lottery. It's up to all of us. Chances are, there will be, though." The production was directed by Andrew C. Love.

Television adaptations
Ellen M. Violett wrote the first television adaptation, seen on Albert McCleery's Cameo Theatre (1950–1955).

The story served as the inspiration for the South Park episode “Britney’s New Look”.

1969 film
Larry Yust's short film The Lottery (1969), produced as part of Encyclopædia Britannicas "Short Story Showcase" series, was ranked by the Academic Film Archive "as one of the two bestselling educational films ever". It has an accompanying ten-minute commentary film Discussion of "The Lottery" by University of Southern California English professor James Durbin. Featuring Ed Begley Jr. as Jack Watson in his third film, Yust's adaptation has an atmosphere of naturalism and small-town authenticity with its shots of pickup trucks in Fellows, California, and the townspeople of Fellows and Taft, California.

1996 TV film
Anthony Spinner's feature-length TV film The Lottery, which premiered September 29, 1996, on NBC, expands upon the original Shirley Jackson story. It was nominated for a 1997 Saturn Award for Best Single Genre Television Presentation.

Graphic novel
In 2016 Miles Hyman, a grandson of Jackson, created a graphic novel adaption titled Shirley Jackson's "The Lottery": The Authorized Graphic Adaptation. His version abbreviates the wording of the source work and relies on graphics to portray other aspects of the narrative. He also wrote his own introduction. Alyson Ward of the Houston Chronicle wrote the graphics "push a little further than his grandmother's words did", though she stated Hyman's version reveals details of the story earlier than in the original work.

Video games
In the 2010 video game Fallout: New Vegas, a location in the game, Vault 11, takes inspirations from the story, with a main difference being a tangible threat instead of the superficial threat of a bad harvest.

Music Videos
Marilyn Manson used The Lottery as inspiration for his music video for the song Man That You Fear off his album Antichrist Superstar.

In popular culture
In the Simpsons episode Dog of Death, a newscaster notes that all copies of Shirley Jackson's the Lottery have been taken out of the Springfield library. He goes
on to note that the book offers no tips on winning the lottery. It is instead "A chilling tale of Conformity...gone mad".

See also
 "The Lottery in Babylon"
 "Britney's New Look"
 "Dog of Death"
 "Achan (biblical figure)"

Notes

References

Further reading

External links
 Read "The Lottery" in the New Yorker archive (subscription required) – or without subscription 
Read in full via Middlebury College
Salon: Jonathan Lethem: "Monstrous Acts and Little Murders"
 "The Lottery" study guide and teaching guide – analysis, themes, quotes, multimedia for students and teachers
 The New Yorker podcast: A. M. Homes discusses and reads "The Lottery"
 NBC Short Story: "The Lottery" (March 14, 1951)
 "The Lottery" read by Maureen Stapleton
 1988 interview with Judy Oppenheimer
 Audio dramatization from WOUB Public Media (Athens, Ohio)
 Summary of The Lottery

1948 short stories
1969 films
1996 television films
1996 films
Dystopian literature
Fiction about death games
Films based on short fiction
Horror short stories
Fiction about human sacrifice
Obscenity controversies in literature
Short stories adapted into films
Short stories by Shirley Jackson
Works originally published in The New Yorker
Works about violence
Censored books
Works about lotteries